The MG-347 is a state highway located in the Brazilian state of Minas Gerais. Due to the direction it travels, it is considered a diagonal road.

Route
It connects Carmo de Minas — a municipality in the Circuito das Águas — to the BR-459 highway, in the municipality of Piranguinho. The highway is located in the Mesoregion of the South and Southwest of Minas Gerais and passes through the municipalities of Carmo de Minas, Cristina, Pedralva, São José do Alegre and Piranguinho.

References 

Highways in Minas Gerais